Byron Jones may refer to:

Byron M. Jones, Canadian Christian film producer 
Byron Q. Jones (1888–1959), American aviator and military officer
Byron Jones (American football) (born 1992), American football player
Byron Jones (basketball), American basketball player
B. Todd Jones (born 1957), acting director of the United States Bureau of Alcohol, Tobacco, Firearms and Explosives, and United States Attorney for the District of Minnesota